Yerkin Oleguly Tapalov (Erkın Olegūly Tapalov; born 3 September 1993) is a Kazakhstani footballer who plays as a midfielder for Akzhayik and the Kazakhstan national team.

Career
Tapalov made his professional debut with Akzhayik in a 4–1 Kazakhstan Cup loss to FC Taraz on 20 April 2011.

International career
Tapalov made his international debut for the Kazakhstan national team in a friendly 1–0 win over Moldova on 21 February 2019.

References

External links
 
 
 Vesti Profile

1993 births
Living people
People from Oral, Kazakhstan
Kazakhstani footballers
Kazakhstan international footballers
Association football midfielders
FC Akzhayik players
FC Zhetysu players
FC Shakhter Karagandy players
Kazakhstan Premier League players